Anzi may refer to:

 Anzi, Basilicata, Italy
 Anzi, Morocco